Aquostic – Stripped Bare is the thirty-first studio album by English rock band Status Quo, first released on 17 October 2014. Produced by Mike Paxman, this is the band's first completely acoustic album and the first recorded with drummer Leon Cave. Its cover features a photograph by Canadian singer Bryan Adams. The album earned a Gold certification in January 2015.

Background
"We did an album of our old songs," Francis Rossi observed, "posed nude on the cover, got Bryan Adams to shoot it… Why do you do it? Because it made everyone talk about it… All those songs were written acoustically. It would be great to have new stuff out. But if you and I were the record company, and the manager comes to us and says, 'They want to write a whole new album of acoustic stuff,' they'd say, 'Fuck off, give us the hits.'"

"I went from not wanting to be involved to really liking it," Rossi revealed. "The new version of 'All the Reasons' is as good as the original, or better. The same with 'Rain', which is a song I really didn't think would work in such a format." "The arrangements of most of these songs are vastly different," noted Rick Parfitt, "especially what we've done to 'Don't Drive My Car', which sounds like a cross between Stéphane Grappelli and Django Reinhardt. People will be taken aback."

Performance
To launch the album, the band gave a ninety-minute performance of the songs at The Roundhouse in London on 22 October 2014. The concert was recorded and broadcast live by BBC Radio 2 as part of their In Concert series. The band were augmented on stage by guitarist Freddie Edwards, son of bassist John Edwards.

The concert was introduced by BBC Radio 2's Jo Whiley. Its setlist differed from the order of the eventual album track listing.

Track listing 

Tracks 13, 14 and 23 are bonus tracks and are not on the Spotify version, vinyl LP or on most CD pressings. The medley of "Mystery Song" and "Little Lady" was released on the British CD edition, the German MediaMarkt/Saturn edition, as well as the German box set. The latter, however, included only the standard 22-track CD; the medley was instead included on an extra 7" single that also has the exclusive "Strings Mix" of "Claudie". "Rollin' Home" was part of the iTunes edition. All three bonus tracks were performed live at the Roundhouse. The single "Pictures of Matchstick Men" also included a "London Mix" of the song.

Personnel

Status Quo
 Francis Rossi − guitars, vocals
 Rick Parfitt − guitars, ukulele, vocals
 Andy Bown − guitar, mandolin, harmonica, piano, vocals
 John "Rhino" Edwards − guitar, bass, vocals
 Leon Cave − guitar, drums, vocals

Additional musicians
 Geraint Watkins − accordion
 Martin Ditcham − percussion
 Amy Smith − background vocals
 Richard Benbow − string arrangements
 Lucy Wilkins − (leader) violin
 Howard Gott − violin
 Natalia Bonner − violin
 Alison Dods − violin
 Sophie Sirota − viola
 Sarah Wilson − cello

Production
 Mike Paxman − production
 Gregg Jackman − recording, mixing

Chart performance

Weekly charts

Year-end charts

Certifications

References 

Status Quo (band) albums
2014 albums
Warner Records albums
Albums produced by Mike Paxman